Andrew (Drew) David Endy (born 1970) is a synthetic biologist and tenured associate professor of bioengineering at Stanford University, California.

Education and Work History
Endy received his PhD from Dartmouth College in 1997 for his work on genetic engineering using T7 phage.

Endy was a junior fellow for 3 years and later an Assistant Professor of Biological Engineering at MIT, from 2002-2008. In 2008, Endy moved to Stanford University, where he currently serves as an Associate Professor of Bioengineering.

Research
With Thomas Knight, Gerald Jay Sussman, Randy Rettberg, and others at MIT, Endy worked on synthetic biology and the engineering of standardized biological components, devices, and parts, collectively known as BioBricks. Endy is one of several founders of the Registry of Standard Biological Parts, and invented an abstraction hierarchy for integrated genetic systems.

Endy has been one of the early promoters of open source biology, and helped start the Biobricks Foundation, a not-for-profit organization that will work to support open-source biology. He was also a co-founder of the now defunct Codon Devices, a biotechnology startup company that aimed to commercialize synthetic biology.

In 2009, Michael Specter called Endy "synthetic biology’s most compelling evangelist" in his book Denialism: How Irrational Thinking Hinders Scientific Progress, Harms the Planet, and Threatens Our Lives, as Endy is persistent in discussing both the prospects and dangers of synthetic biology.

Endy headed a team of researchers that in March 2013 created the biological equivalent of a transistor, which they dubbed a "transcriptor".  The invention was the final of the three components necessary to build a fully functional biocomputer: data storage, information transmission, and a basic system of logic.

Endy is a founder and steering group member of the Build-a-Cell Initiative, an international collaboration investigating creation of synthetic live cells.

References

External links
 Lab webpage
 Personal page on OpenWetWare for Drew Endy
 Abstraction hierarchy for integrated genetic systems
 Steal This Genome
 Biology Yearns to be Free
 Gen9
 Article on the commercialization of DNA synthesis
 Registry of Standard Biological Parts
 Interview with Drew Endy in Edge - the third culture
 Northwestern Silverstein Lecture

1970 births
Living people
Synthetic biologists
MIT School of Engineering faculty
American bioengineers
Stanford University School of Engineering faculty